Italian musical group Eiffel 65 has released three studio albums, two extended plays and sixteen singles.

Albums

Studio albums

Singles

Promotional singles

Remixes
 1999: Kim Lukas – "All I Really Want"
 1999: Simone Jay – "Paradise"
 1999: Bloodhound Gang – "The Bad Touch"
 1999: Ann Lee – "Ring My Bell"
 1999: 883 – "La Regina Del Celebrità"
 1999: Andreas Johnson – "Glorious"
 1999: Kool & The Gang – "Get Down On It"
 1999: Nek – "La Vita E'"
 1999: Aqua – "Freaky Friday"
 2000: Stefano & Roger – "Let It Be The Night"
 2000: Toni Braxton – "Spanish Guitar"
 2000: Regina – "You And Me"
 2000: Alex Party – "U Gotta Be"
 2000: Unique II vs. Sheila Fernandez – "Forever"
 2000: Piero Pelu – "Toro Loco"
 2000: Anna Vissi – "Everything I Am"
 2000: Peach – "Anywhere"
 2000: Love Inc. – "Here Comes The Sunshine"
 2000: S Club 7 – "Reach"
 2000: Gala – "Everyone Has Inside"
 2000: Jean Michel Jarre – "Tout Est Bleu"
 2000: Dr. MacDoo – "Macahula Dance"
 2000: superEva – "Thinking Of You"
 2000: 833 – "Viaggio Al Centro Del Mondo"
 2000: Lutricia McNeal – "Fly Away"
 2000: Serge Gainsbourg & Jane Birkin – "Je T'aime"
 2001: Vasco Rossi – "Ti Prendo E Ti Porto Via"
 2001: Ana Bettz – "Black & White"
 2001: Alphaville – "Big In Japan"
 2001: Lilu – "Little Girl"

References

Discographies of Italian artists
Discography